Nebularia pellisserpentis is a species of sea snail, a marine gastropod mollusc in the family Mitridae, the miters or miter snails.

Description

Distribution
The holotype of this marine species was found off the Philippines.

References

External links
 Reeve, L. A. (1844-1845). Monograph of the genus Mitra. In: Conchologia Iconica, or, illustrations of the shells of molluscous animals, vol. 2, pl. 1-39 and unpaginated text. L. Reeve & Co., London
 Récluz, C. A. (1853). Description de coquilles nouvelles (Genres Turbo, Triton et Mitra). Journal de Conchyliologie. 4: 49-54.
 Adams, A. (1853). Description of fifty-two new species of the genus Mitra, from the Cumingian collection. Proceedings of the Zoological Society of London. (1851) 19: 132-141
 Sowerby, G. B., II. (1874). Monograph of the genus Mitra. In G. B. Sowerby II (ed.), Thesaurus conchyliorum, or monographs of genera of shells. Vol. 4 (31-32): 1–46, pls 352–379. London, privately published
 Crosse H. (1861). Diagnoses d'espèces nouvelles. Journal de Conchyliologie. 9(3): 285
 Fedosov A., Puillandre N., Herrmann M., Kantor Yu., Oliverio M., Dgebuadze P., Modica M.V. & Bouchet P. (2018). The collapse of Mitra: molecular systematics and morphology of the Mitridae (Gastropoda: Neogastropoda). Zoological Journal of the Linnean Society. 183(2): 253-337

pellisserpentis
Gastropods described in 1844